Graham Branch is a  long 2nd order tributary to Tubbs Branch in Sussex County, Delaware.

Course
Graham Branch rises about 1 mile east of Pineridge, Delaware, and then flows north to join Tubbs Branch about 0.5 miles south of Concord.

Watershed
Graham Branch drains  of area, receives about 45.0 in/year of precipitation, has a wetness index of 641.33, and is about 6% forested.

See also
List of rivers of Delaware

References

Rivers of Delaware
Rivers of Sussex County, Delaware